Kalighat Kali Temple is a Hindu temple in Kalighat, Kolkata, West Bengal, India dedicated to the Hindu goddess Kali. It is one of the Shakti Peethas.

Kalighat was a Ghat (landing stage) sacred to Kali on the old course (Adi Ganga)  of the Hooghly river (Bhāgirathi) in the city of Kolkata. The name Kolkata is said to have been derived from the word Kalikata devi of Kalighat Temple. The river over a period of time has moved away from the temple. The temple is now on the banks of a small canal called Adi Ganga which connects to the Hooghly. The Adi Ganga was the original course of the river Hooghly. Hence the name Adi (original) Ganga.

Legend 
Kalighat is regarded as one of the 51  Shakti Peethas of India, where the various parts of Sati's body are said to have fallen, in the course of Shiva's Rudra Tandava. Kalighat represents the site where the toes of the right foot of Dakshayani or Sati fell.

Kalighat is also associated with the worship offered to Kali by a Dasanami Monk by name Chowranga Giri, and the Chowringee area of Calcutta is said to have been named after him.

History

The Kalighat temple in its present form is only about 200 years old, although it has been referred to in Mansar Bhasan composed in the 15th century, and Kavi Kankan Chandi in the 17th century. The present structure of the temple was completed under the Sabarna Roy Chowdhury family's patronage in 1809. Santosh Roy Chowdhury, a Kali devotee himself, started the construction of the present-day temple in 1798. It took 11 years to complete the construction.  The factual authenticity of Roy Chowdhurys' being the traditional patron of the deity is disputed.

Temple details

Shoshti Tala

This is a rectangular altar about three feet high bearing a small cactus plant. Beneath the tree, on an altar three stones are placed side by side - left to right representing the goddesses Shashthi (Shoshti), Shitala and Mangal Chandi. This sacred spot is known as Shoshti Tala or Monosha Tala. This altar was constructed by Gobinda Das Mondal in 1880. The place of the altar is the Samadhi of Brahmananda Giri. Here all the priests are female. No daily worship or offering of Bhog (food offering) is done here. The goddesses here are considered as part of Kali.

Natmandir
A large rectangular covered platform called Natmandir has been erected adjacent to the main temple, from where the face of the image can be seen. This was originally built by Zamindar Kasinath Roy in 1835. It has been subsequently renovated often.

Jor Bangla

The spacious verandah of the main temple facing the image is known as Jor Bangla. Rituals occurring inside the sanctum sanctorum are visible from the Natmandir through the Jor Bangla.

Harkath Tala
This is the spot adjacent to the Natmandir, southwards meant for Bali (sacrifice). There are two Sacrificial altars for animal sacrifices side by side. These are known as Hari-Kath.

Radha-Krishna Temple
This temple is known as Shyama-raya temple and is situated inside the temple at the west side of the main temple. In 1723, a settlement officer of Murshidabad district first erected a separate temple for Radha-Krishna. In 1843 a Zamindar of Bawali called Udoy Narayan erected the present temple in the same spot. The Dolmancha was founded in 1858 by Madan Koley of Saha Nagar. There is a separate kitchen for preparation of vegetarian Bhog (food offering) for Radha-Krishna.

Kundupukur

This is the sacred tank situated in the south-east of the temple outside the boundary walls. Present area of the tank is approximately 10 cottahs. In the past it was bigger and called 'Kaku-Kunda'. The 'Sati-Anga' (the right toe of Sati) was discovered from this tank. It is believed that taking a dip in this small pond/ tank can bestow one with the boon of a child. The water from this tank is regarded as sacred as that of the Ganges. Pilgrims practice the holy dipping event called Snan Yatra.

There had been futile efforts in the past of draining the water from the tank for cleaning, which creates a strong possibility of a subterranean link with the Adi Ganga.

The Kalighat Temple as a Shakti Peeth

The temple is revered as an important Shakti Pitha, by the Shaktism sect of Hinduism. The mythology of Daksha's yajna and Sati's self-immolation is the story behind the origin of Shakti Peethas.
Daksha, the son of Brahma was an ancient entity called Prajapati, or the keeper of the beings in Hinduism. He had a lot of daughters, one of whom was Sati, an incarnation of Adi Parashakti, the primordial mother goddess. She was married to Shiva, the ascetic god, whose abode was in the cold and snowy recesses of Mount Kailash. Daksha frowned upon the marriage, as Shiva was a penniless man, quite unlike the prince Daksha expected him to be. In time, Daksha decided that he would arrange a yajna or a sacrifice where he would invite all the gods, except for Shiva. Sati, his daughter arrived at the venue, uninvited and faced a flurry of insults from her father about her husband. Unable to bear the insults, she cursed her father to face Shva's wrath and immolated herself, promising to be reborn only to a good-natured father. The news of Sati's death set Shiva in an uncontrolled rage. He tore two locks of his hair and created Virabhadra and Mahakali, who desecrated the sacrifice and beheaded Daksha. 
After the huge battle, Brahma and Vishnu appealed to Shiva to restore peace by reviving Daksha. Shiva agreed and replaced Daksha's head with that of the sacrificial goat. Daksha awoke and repented for his sins. Shiva forgave him and walked up to Sati's charred body. Shiva dropped his trident and cried aloud, lamenting his wife's demise. He picked up her body and started the tandava dance, with Sati's burnt body. Fearing that the universe might be destroyed by Shiva, Vishnu sent his Sudarshana Chakra flying and cut Sati's body into fifty-one pieces, which would fall all over the length and breadth of India (and modern-day Pakistan, Nepal, Sri Lanka and Bangladesh). Shiva, having calmed down, went back to his meditation until Sati was reborn as Parvati, married him, and mothered Ganesha and Kartikeya. 

The Shakti Peethas or divine seats of Adi Parashakti, thus came into being wherever the severed parts of Sati's body had fallen. Each of the 51 Peethas has a temple dedicated to the goddess, and a temple dedicated to Shiva, or his fierce incarnation Bhairava, essentially forming important historical centers to mark the marriage of Shiva and Shakti, and also the philosophical fact that Shiva is nothing without his Shakti and vice versa. The goddess is worshipped here as Dakshina Kali while Shiva is worshipped as Nakuleshwar. It is believed that the right big toe of Sati (according to another opinion, four toes of right leg) fell here at Kalighat. However, some Puranas also mention that the face of the Goddess fell here, got fossilized, and is worshipped here.

The 51 Shakti Peethas are linked to the 51 letters in the Sanskrit alphabet, each carrying the power to invoke one of the goddesses associated with them. These letters are called Beeja Mantras or the seeds of the primordial sounds of creation. The Beeja Mantra for Dakshina Kali is Krīm.

The mythological texts which include the Kalika Purana, recognize four Shakti Peethas as sites where most of the energy is. Vimala where the feet fell (Pada Khanda), Tara Tarini housing the breasts (Stana Khanda), Kamakhya, where the genitals fell (Yoni Khanda) and Dakshina Kali, where the face fell (Mukha Khanda). These four temples originated from the lifeless body of Sati.

See also
 Dakshineswar Kali Temple

References

Further reading

External links

 

1809 establishments in India
Hindu temples in Kolkata
Shakti Peethas
Hindu temples practicing animal sacrifice